Dennison "Denni" Neufeld (born January 25, 1981) is a Canadian curler from Winnipeg, Manitoba.

Born in Steinbach, Manitoba, Neufeld won a gold medal for Manitoba at the 1999 Canada Games. In 2001 he joined Mike McEwen's team. After a few years of curling on-and-off together, the team of McEwen, Neufeld, brother B. J. Neufeld, and Matt Wozniak was formed in 2007. Neufeld played lead stones for the team, which lasted for 11 years until the end of the 2017-18 curling season, when they disbanded. The following season, Neufeld played second for Team Jason Gunnlaugson. He announced that he would be stepping back from curling at the end of the season.

Personal 
Neufeld started curling around the age of ten and cites the achievements of his father as leading his interest into the game of curling. His father is Chris Neufeld who was a three time Manitoba curling champion and one time Labatt Brier champion in 1992 as part of the Vic Peters team. Neufeld is employed as a realtor for Royal LePage Prime Real Estate. He is married to Cheryl Neufeld and has two children.

Neufeld's younger brother, B.J. Neufeld, is also a curler.

Grand Slam record

References

External links

1981 births
Living people
Sportspeople from Steinbach, Manitoba
Curlers from Winnipeg
Canadian real estate agents
Canadian male curlers
Universiade medalists in curling
Universiade gold medalists for Canada
Medalists at the 2003 Winter Universiade
Canada Cup (curling) participants